Winifred Phillips  is an American music composer and author. Her music composition credits include God of War,  Assassin's Creed III: Liberation, and the LittleBigPlanet series.

Early life

Phillips' love of music began in childhood, supported by her experiences in the public school system. She looked upon her teachers and looked forward to her music classes. In middle school, her band teacher found out that she was a quick learner and got into the habit of giving her a new instrument to learn whenever there was a gap in one of his ensembles. She got to play all sorts of music and all different kinds of instruments.

Phillips had been an avid gamer in her childhood and played everything from shooters and side-scrollers to sprawling RPGs. However, it was only after working in radio that she realized she could compose music for games.

Career

Early career
From 1992 to 2003, Phillips was the composer, producer and actress in a series of radio dramas, first presented on National Public Radio Playhouse under the title Generations Radio Theater Presents, and then later as Generations Radio Theater Presents: Radio Tales.  This anthology series adapted classic works of American and world literature, and was a recipient of funding from the National Endowment for the Arts.  The series was described by NPR as "featuring a top-to-bottom music score that is completely original and fully integrated to the text".  The programs aired regularly as the Radio Tales series on the Sirius XM Book Radio channel.

Video games

In 2004, Phillips contributed music to her first video game project, God of War. She has composed music for more than 20 video games. Some relevant titles include the LittleBigPlanet video game franchise, SimAnimals and Assassin's Creed III: Liberation.

Writing
Phillips is the author of the book A Composer’s Guide to Game Music, which was published by the MIT Press in March 2014.  The book has won several awards including a National Indie Excellence Book Award, and a Nonfiction Book Award from the Nonfiction Authors Association.

The book was very well received by critics and in 2015, O'Reilly Japan published a Japanese language edition titled Game Sound Production Guide - Composer Techniques for Interactive Music.

Works

Discography

Games

LittleBigPlanet Series

Other games

Awards

Video Games

Other awards 

 Hollywood Music in Media Award 2021 (Nomination), Best Holiday Music: Ho-Ho-Holiday
 American Women in Radio and Television Gracie Award 2001, 2003, 2004: Best National Network Drama (Radio Tales)
 The New York Festivals WorldMedal 2004: (Radio Tales)
 American Women in Radio and Television Gracie Award 1998: Outstanding Achievement by an Actress ("The Yellow Wallpaper")
 Golden Reel Awards 2001 / National Federation of Community Broadcasters (Radio Tales)
 The Audio Publishers Association Audie Award 1999 (Nomination)

References

External links
 Winifred Phillips' Website
 Winifred Phillips Video Interview with GameSpot.com

Year of birth missing (living people)
21st-century American composers
American women composers
American radio actresses
American radio producers
Place of birth missing (living people)
Audiobook narrators
Living people
Video game composers
21st-century American women musicians
21st-century women composers
Women radio producers